Kang Bong-chil (born 7 November 1943) is a North Korean football midfielder who played for North Korea in the 1966 FIFA World Cup. He also played for 2.8 Sports Team.

References

1943 births
North Korean footballers
North Korea international footballers
Association football midfielders
1966 FIFA World Cup players
Living people